Maggi & Me is a Singaporean fantasy situation comedy that airs on Mediacorp Channel 5. The English-language series debuted 25 July 2006 and stars Fiona Xie and Adrian Pang in the title roles. The series wrapped up its season 1 finale on 17 October 2006 and the season 2 finale on 12 February 2008. The series title is a play on Maggimee, the nickname for Maggi's noodle products.

Synopsis
Maggi & Me chronicles the misadventures of a Singaporean scam artist, Johnny Tan  (Pang), who, during a phony scene that he set up to scam a couple of old women, accidentally befriends the ghost of a deceased bride (Xie), who under unexplained circumstances, might have been killed on her wedding night. The series' setting is similar to that of the 2005 American film Just Like Heaven. This unusual pairing finds themselves working together in unlikely situations, along the lines of Ghostbusters and Ghost Whisperer, with a little Psych and Jennifer Slept Here thrown in for good measure.

Because he is the only one that can see her, Johnny has to keep his sanity because the spirit in question is also suffering from spectral amnesia: It appears that she doesn't remember anything about how she died or her mortal life, except for the letter M that she has on her necklace (the reason is that her name, Emily and her nickname, Em, which is why he decided to name her "Maggi" after the food products of the same name, which also happens to be his brand of cup noodles that he constantly eats). With that mystery surrounding her death, Johnny also believes that he can put together the pieces of her puzzle and find out the truth about his spirited partner so her soul can finally rest in peace, even though Maggi is hoping for a chance at being reincarnated.

Characters

Episodes

Episode Guide & Synopsis at MOBTV
Season 1
1. (25 July 2006)
2. Crying Girl(1 August 2006)
3. Baby(8 August 2006)
4. Martin(15 August 2006)
5. Roland(22 August 2006)
6. Henry(29 August 2006)
7. Ah Pok(5 September 2006)
8. Rajoo (12 September 2006)
9. Menatchi (19 September 2006)
10. Tanaka & Jones (26 September 2006)
11. Jenny Ban (3 October 2006)
12. Emily (Part 1) (10 October 2006)
13. Emily (Part 2) (17 October 2006)

Episode Guide & Synopsis at MOBTV
Season 2 
1. Mabel Poon (Part 1)(6 November 2007)
2. Mabel Poon (Part 2)(13 November 2007)
3. Collin Pocket (20 November 2007)
4. George (27 November 2007)
5. Aunty Lu (4 December 2007)
6. Alex (Part 1) (18 December 2007)
7. Alex (Part 2) (1 January 2008)
8. Molly (8 January 2008)
9. Flora (15 January 2008)
10. Ben Ben (22 January 2008)
11. Mona (29 January 2008)
12. Bebe (5 February 2008)
13. Hector (12 February 2008)

Broadcasters

Syndication
In 2009, Galloping Films, an Australian-based television and film distribution company, acquired the international rights to MediaCorp-produced programs, including Maggi & Me, for syndication outside of Singapore

References

External links
Maggi & Me Season 1 at Channel 5's website
Maggi & Me Season 2 at Channel 5's website
Article about the show's stars (1st Article)
Article about the show's stars (2nd Article)
Maggi & Me commentary forum

2006 Singaporean television series debuts
2008 Singaporean television series endings
Singaporean television sitcoms
Fantasy television series
Channel 5 (Singapore) original programming